Fleet railway station was a station in Fleet, Lincolnshire. It opened in 1862 and closed to passengers in 1959, with the goods yard closing on 3 February 1964.

References

Disused railway stations in Lincolnshire
Former Midland and Great Northern Joint Railway stations
Railway stations in Great Britain opened in 1862
Railway stations in Great Britain closed in 1959
1862 establishments in England